Fibroblast growth factor 17 is a protein that in humans is encoded by the FGF17 gene.

The protein encoded by this gene is a member of the fibroblast growth factor (FGF) family. FGF family members possess broad mitogenic and cell survival activities and are involved in a variety of biological processes, including embryonic development cell growth, morphogenesis, tissue repair, tumor growth, and invasion. This gene was shown to be prominently expressed in the cerebellum and cortex. The mouse homolog of this gene was localized to specific sites in the midline structures of the forebrain, the midbrain-hindbrain junction, developing skeleton and developing arteries, which suggests a role in central nervous system, bone and vascular development.  This gene was referred to as FGF-13 in reference 2, however, its amino acid sequence and chromosomal localization are identical to FGF17.

References

Further reading